Paul Galea (born 19 February 1970) is an Australian former professional rugby league footballer who played in the 1990s.

Background
Originally from Moranbah, Queensland, Galea played for the Mackay Magpies and was selected in the Australian Schoolboys under-15 merit side in 1985. His younger brother Brett played first grade for the Brisbane Broncos and Adelaide Rams.

Playing career
In 1992, Galea joined the Gold Coast Seagulls after playing for the Fortitude Valley Diehards. In Round 4 of the 1992 NSWRL season, he made his first grade debut in a 20–0 loss to the Cronulla Sharks. He spent three seasons with the Gold Coast, playing 18 games, scoring one try.

In 1995, Galea joined the newly formed North Queensland Cowboys, and started at lock in their inaugural game. In his first season with the Cowboys, he played 19 games, scoring four tries, and won the club's Club Person of the Year award. Galea played just six games for the Cowboys over the following two seasons, leaving the club at the end of the 1997 season.

Achievements and accolades

Individual
North Queensland Cowboys Club Person of the Year: 1995

Statistics

NSWRL/ARL/Super League

Post-playing career
In 2010, while coaching the Mackay Magpies under-11 side, Galea was banned from coaching junior rugby league for two-and-a-half years after punching an official.

References

1970 births
Living people
Australian rugby league players
Gold Coast Chargers players
North Queensland Cowboys players
Fortitude Valley Diehards players
Rugby league centres
Rugby league second-rows
Rugby league locks
Rugby league players from Mackay, Queensland